Estonian Ski Association (abbreviation ESA) is one of the sport governing bodies in Estonia which deals with skiing (including alpine, cross-country, nordic combined, freestyle and jumping, snowboarding). Independent sport governing body is Estonian Biathlon Union.

ESA is a successor of Estonian Winter Sport Association which was established on 28 November 1921.

References

External links
 

Sports governing bodies in Estonia
Winter sports in Estonia
Sports organizations established in 1921
National members of the International Ski Federation